Douglas Alexander Clarke-Smith (2 August 188812 March 1959), professionally known as D. A. Clarke-Smith or sometimes Douglas A. Clarke-Smith was a British actor. In a stage career lasting from 1913 to 1954, with interruptions to fight in both World Wars, he played a wide range of roles, in modern commercial plays and established classics. He was seen onstage in the West End, on tour in Britain, and on Broadway. In addition to his stage career, he appeared frequently on BBC radio, and was seen in numerous films between  1929 and 1956.

Life and career

Early years

Clarke-Smith  was born on 2 August 1888 at Montrose, Scotland. He was educated at Blackheath, London, and Pembroke College, Oxford, where he joined the Oxford University Dramatic Society in 1910. He made his professional stage debut at the Kingsway Theatre in 1913 in Arnold Bennett's The Great Adventure, succeeding Clarence Derwent in the role of Ebag. On tour in the same play he was promoted to the leading role, Ilam Carve, created by Henry Ainley.

In 1914 on the outbreak of the First World War Clarke-Smith joined the Royal Artillery, and was mentioned in despatches three times. In 1919 he joined the Birmingham Repertory Company where his roles included Young Marlowe in She Stoops to Conquer, John Worthing in The Importance of Being Earnest, Joseph Surface in The School for Scandal and in Shakespeare, Malvolio in Twelfth Night, Benedick in Much Ado About Nothing, Shylock in The Merchant of Venice and Hotspur in Henry IV, Part 1.

Clarke-Smith was producer for the Lena Ashwell Players for nearly a year from December 1919. In 1920 he married the actress Alice Bowes. They had two children. The marriage was later dissolved. In the 1920s and 1930s Clarke-Smith was often seen on the West End stage in new plays including Six Characters in Search of an Author, and also in classics, playing Bonnington in The Doctor's Dilemma, Rank in A Doll's House, Kroll in Rosmersholm, Brack in Hedda Gabler and Solness in The Master Builder, and Shakespearean roles including Peter Quince in A Midsummer Night's Dream, Malvolio and Benedick. He appeared on Broadway in 1930 in Insult, by J. E. Harold Terry and Harry Tighe.

Later years

In 1928 Clarke-Smith made the first of his many broadcasts for the BBC. In 1939 he joined the BBC Repertory Company but left later in the year to serve once more in the Army, becoming a staff captain. He was invalided out in 1944 and returned to the stage at the Liverpool Playhouse as a member of the visiting Old Vic Company. In June 1945 he married for the second time; his spouse was Catherine Rosemary Ellis; they had three children. Clarke-Smith's post-war stage career followed the pattern of his earlier years, interspersing new commercial plays with revivals of classics. The latter included Man and Superman in its entirety, including the rarely staged "Don Juan in Hell" episode; he played Roebuck Ramsden in the main play and the Statue of Don Gonzalo in the Hell scene. His final stage role was Mr Myers, QC, in Witness for the Prosecution in 1953–54.

Clarke-Smith died on 12 March 1959, in Withyham in Sussex, aged 70.

Filmography

References and sources

References

Sources

External links
 

1888 births
1959 deaths
British male film actors
Alumni of the University of Oxford
People from Montrose, Angus
20th-century British male actors
People from Withyham